The following comparison of portable media players compares general and technical information for notable digital playback devices.

General

Technical specifications

Synching and transfer

Wi-Fi connectivity

Audio formats

Video formats

Additional features

See also 
 Portable media player

Notes and references 

Portable Media Players
Portable media players